This is a list of flag bearers who have represented Montenegro at the Olympics.

List of flag bearers 
Flag bearers carry the national flag of their country at the opening ceremony of the Olympic Games.

Key

See also
Montenegro at the Olympics
List of flag bearers for Yugoslavia at the Olympics
List of flag bearers for Serbia and Montenegro at the Olympics

References

Montenegro at the Olympics
Montenegro
Olympic flagbearers
Olympic flagbearers